Beetham Tower can refer to these high-rise buildings in the UK, owned by the Beetham Organization:

 10 Holloway Circus, also known as Beetham Tower, Birmingham
 Beetham Tower, Liverpool
 Beetham Tower, London
 Beetham Tower, Manchester, also known as the Hilton Tower
 West Tower also known as Beetham Tower West, Liverpool